SMS Warasdiner was a destroyer launched in 1913 as Lung Tuan, intended for sale to China. She was taken over by the Austro-Hungarian Navy in 1914, renamed and rearmed. She served in World War I with the Austro-Hungarian Navy. Following the war, the ship was ceded to Italy and scrapped.

Construction and design
In 1912, China placed an order for a single destroyer with the Austrian shipyard Stabilimento Tecnico Triestino (STT) of Trieste. The design of the destroyer, to be named Lung Tuan, was based on that of the Austro-Hungarian Navy's , which had entered service between 1905 and 1911.

The ship was to be armed with two 12-pounder  and four 3-pounder  guns, all supplied by Armstrong Whitworth of Great Britain and two  torpedo tubes.

Lung Tuan was laid down in 1912 and launched in 1913. Although the Huszár class and therefore Lung Tuan were obsolete by 1913, the Chinese government ordered a further 12 destroyers from STT that year, partly due to the low price (£16,500 per ship).

Service
Lung Tuan was virtually complete when Austria-Hungary  declared war with Serbia on 28 July 1914, beginning the First World War. Lung Tuan was seized by Austria-Hungary on 1 August and towed to Pola where she was re-armed with Austrian weapons, receiving a gun outfit of two  L/45 Skoda guns and four 6.6 cm L/30 guns, together with four 45 cm torpedo tubes. Renamed Warasdiner, the ship entered service with the Austro-Hungarian Navy on 10 September 1914.

Warasdiner served for the remainder of the First World War. On 18–19 June 1915, the Austro-Hungarian Navy carried out a series of raids against towns on the Italian Adriatic coast, with Warasdiner shelling Monopoli, south-east of Bari on 19 June. The French and Italian destroyers set off in pursuit of the Austro-Hungarian ships, but broke off the chase as they neared the Austrian base of Cattaro (now Kotor), when the Austrian cruiser  and two torpedo boats sortied in support of Warasdiner and Wildfang.

She was ceded to Italy in 1920 and scrapped.

References

Notes

Citations

Bibliography

1913 ships
Ships built in Austria-Hungary
Destroyers of the Austro-Hungarian Navy
Destroyer classes
World War I destroyers of Austria-Hungary